Bernard Hollander (1864 – 6 February 1934) was a London psychiatrist and one of the main proponents of the new interest in phrenology in the early 20th century.

Life and work
Hollander was born in Vienna, and settled in London in 1883, where he attended King's College. After graduation he was appointed to the post of physician at the British Hospital for Mental Disorders and Brain Diseases. Hollander was naturalized a British citizen in 1894.

Hollander first received critical acclaim for his Positive Philosophy of the Mind (L. N. Fowler, 1891). His main works, The Mental Function of the Brain (1901) and Scientific Phrenology (1902), are an appraisal of the teachings of Franz Joseph Gall. Hollander also introduced a quantitative approach to the phrenological diagnosis, defining a methodology for measuring the skull and comparing the measurements with statistical averages.

Hollander founded the Ethological Society, and was the first editor of the Ethological Journal.

Notes

Further reading
Works by Hollander:
 The revival of phrenology (London and New York, G. P. Putnam's sons, 1901).
 Scientific Phrenology: being a practical mental science and guide to human character (London, Grant Richards, 1902)
 The mental symptoms of brain disease: an aid to the surgical treatment of insanity, due to injury, haemorrhage, tumours, and other circumscribed lesions of the brain (London, Rebman, 1910).
 Nervous disorders of men; the modern psychological conception of their causes, effects, and rational treatment (London, K. Paul, Trench, Trübner & Co. [etc.], 1916).
 Abnormal children : nervous, mischievous, precocious, and backward (London : K. Paul, Trench, Trubner, 1916)
 In search of the soul: and the mechanism of thought, emotion, and conduct. Volume 1, Volume 2 (London: Kegan Paul, Trench, Trubner, 1920).
 The psychology of misconduct, vice, and crime (London : G. Allen & Unwin, ltd., 1922).
 Methods and Uses of Hypnosis & Self-Hypnosis: A Treatise on the Powers of the Subconscious Mind (London : G. Allen & Unwin, ltd., 1928).

About Hollander:
 Culbertson, J.C. (ed.) (1890) "The Old and New Phrenologies" The Cincinnati Lancet-Clinic vol. 63 (New Series, vol. 24)  pp. 176-177, reprinted from the British Medical Journal.

1864 births
1934 deaths
Phrenologists
English psychiatrists
Ethologists